John William Crawford (born May 15, 1846) was an American medical doctor and politician who served as the 25th Mayor of Lawrence, Massachusetts.

Early life
Crawford was born Glasgow, Scotland on May 15, 1846.

Medical School education
Crawford graduated from Harvard Medical School in 1867.

Mayor of Lawrence, Massachusetts
Crawford was the Mayor of Lawrence, Massachusetts in 1890.

References

Bibliography

"The Standard Medical Directory of North America, 1902: Including a Directory of Practicing Physicians in The United States of America, Canada, Cuba, Mexico and Central America," pg. 234. (1902).
Harrington, Thomas Francis: "The Harvard Medical School: A History, Narrative and Documentary 1782 – 1905, Volume III," pg. 1525, (1905).

Footnotes

  

1846 births
Scottish emigrants to the United States
Physicians from Massachusetts
Mayors of Lawrence, Massachusetts
Harvard Medical School alumni
Year of death missing